Simara Airport  is a domestic airport located in Jitpur Simara  serving Bara District, a district in Madhesh Province in Nepal. It also serves Birgunj, Nepal's fifth biggest city.

History
The airport was established on 4 July 1958, although there is evidence that the airport existed in some form as early as 1946 and would therefore be the oldest airport in Nepal — this fact is, however, disputed. The airport is operated by the Civil Aviation Authority of Nepal.

Facilities

Airlines and destinations

Statistics

Access
The airport is located near Tribhuvan Highway.

Accidents and incidents
 7 May 1946 - A Royal Air Force Douglas C-47 Skytrain overran the runway upon touchdown at Simara Airport and was fully destroyed. There were no fatalities. This is considered to be the first aviation accident in the History of Nepal.
 30 August 1955 - A Kalinga Airlines Douglas Dakota lifted off prematurely at Simara Airport in order to avoid hitting someone crossing the runway. Two of the three crew members aboard were killed.
 25 December 1999 - A Skyline Airways De Havilland Canada DHC-6 Twin Otter 300 crashed 5 minutes after takeoff from Simara Airport on a flight to Kathmandu. All three crew and seven passengers were killed.

References

External links
 

Airports in Nepal
1958 establishments in Nepal